Adgur Paatovich Kakoba (born 24 November 1965 in Atara) is the current Minister for Education and Science of Abkhazia. Kakoba was appointed on 15 October 2014 by newly elected President Raul Khajimba as Minister for Education, Science, Sports and Youth Policy. The latter two portfolios were transformed into separate State Committees on 30 March 2015.

References

1965 births
Living people
Ministers for Education of Abkhazia
People from Ochamchira District